Todd Stephens is an American film director, writer, and producer. He was raised in Sandusky, Ohio, which has served as the setting for several of his films, many of which are gay-themed. He both wrote and produced the autobiographical coming out film Edge of Seventeen, which was released in 1998. He has directed the 2001 film Gypsy 83 as well as Another Gay Movie, which was released in 2006, and the follow-up Another Gay Sequel: Gays Gone Wild!, which premiered at the Frameline Film Festival in San Francisco on June 28, 2008.

Filmography
Director:
Gypsy 83 (2001)
Another Gay Movie (2006)
Another Gay Sequel: Gays Gone Wild! (2008)
Swan Song (2021)

Writer:
Edge of Seventeen (1998) 
Gypsy 83 (2001) (also story) 
Another Gay Movie (2006) (screenplay) (story) 
Another Gay Sequel: Gays Gone Wild (2008) 
Swan Song (2021)

Producer:
Edge of Seventeen (1998) (producer) 
Gypsy 83 (2001) (producer) 
Another Gay Movie (2006) (producer) 
Another Gay Sequel: Gays Gone Wild (2008) (producer) 
Swan Song (2021) (producer) 

Soundtrack:
Gypsy 83 (2001) (writer: "Voice So Sweet")
Another Gay Movie (2006) (writer: "Another Gay Sunshine Day", "Another Ray of Sunshine") 

Awards:
L.A. Outfest 
Year Result Award Category/Recipient(s) 
1998 Won Grand Jury Award Outstanding Screenwriting
for: Edge of Seventeen (1998)

Seattle Lesbian & Gay Film Festival 
Year Result Award Category/Recipient(s) 
2001 Won Award for Excellence Best New Director
for: Gypsy 83 (2001)

Torino International Gay & Lesbian Film Festival 
Year Result Award Category/Recipient(s) 
2002 Won Audience Award Best Feature Film for: Gypsy 83 (2001)
Nominated Best Feature Film 
for: Gypsy 83 (2001)

Toronto Inside Out Lesbian and Gay Film and Video Festival 
Year Result Award Category/Recipient(s) 
2002 Won Audience Award Best Feature Film or Video
for: Gypsy 83 (2001)

Further reading
 Padva, Gilad. Boys Want to Have Fun! Carnivalesque Adolescence and Nostalgic Resorts in Another Gay Movie and Another Gay Sequel. In Padva, Gilad, Queer Nostalgia in Cinema and Pop Culture, pp. 98–122 (Palgrave Macmillan, 2014).

External links

Year of birth missing (living people)
Living people
American film directors
LGBT people from Ohio
LGBT film directors